Astley Hall may refer to 

 Astley Hall (Chorley), country house in Lancashire, England
 Astley Hall (Stourport-on-Severn), country house in Worcestershire, England